Philip Rainey (born 12 July 1959, in Ballymena, Northern Ireland) is a former Irish rugby union international player who played for the Irish national rugby union team. He played as a fullback.
He played for the Ireland team in 1989, winning one cap and was part of the Ireland squad at the 1987 Rugby World Cup.

References

External links

1959 births
Living people
Irish rugby union players
Ireland international rugby union players
Rugby union players from Ballymena
Rugby union fullbacks